Sudan will compete at the 2009 World Championships in Athletics from 15–23 August. A team of 9 athletes was announced in preparation for the competition. Selected athletes have achieved one of the competition's qualifying standards. The squad includes 800 metres olympic silver medalist Ismail Ahmed Ismail, and 800 metres World Junior champion Abubaker Kaki.

Team selection

Track and road events

Field and combined events

Results

Men

Women

References

External links
Official competition website

Nations at the 2009 World Championships in Athletics
Sudan at the World Championships in Athletics
2009 in Sudanese sport